Cláudio Ibrahim Vaz Leal (born 4 April 1964 in Bagé, Brazil), better known as Branco, is Brazilian former footballer who played as a left back. A member of the triumphant Brazilian team in the 1994 FIFA World Cup, Branco was a renowned free kick specialist (as was his international successor, Roberto Carlos) known for his accuracy of placing the ball in the direction that he wanted the free kick to go.

Club career
At club level, Branco played for Internacional (1980–81), Fluminense (1981–86, 1994 and 1998), Brescia (1986–88), FC Porto (1988–91), Genoa (1991–93), Grêmio (1992–94), Flamengo (1995), Corinthians (1995), Middlesbrough (1996), and MetroStars (1997). Branco's late career in England and the United States was marred by weight problems.

During his spell at Middlesbrough he scored twice, both goals coming against Hereford in the League Cup second round, once at home in the first leg and once away in the second. However, he played just nine times in the Premier League and by Christmas 1996 he had left the club on a free transfer after less than a year.

International career
Branco appeared 72 times for Brazil, between April 1985 and February 1995, and scored nine goals. After sitting out the first four games at the 1994 World Cup, he replaced Leonardo on the left after Leonardo was banned for a deliberate elbow on Tab Ramos in the second-round game against the USA. Branco scored with a memorable late free kick from 35 metres to eliminate the Netherlands in the quarter-finals, and took one of Brazil's penalties in the shootout when they beat Italy in the final. He played in a total of twelve matches in three World Cup tournaments.

Manager
As of 2006, Branco was the general manager overseeing Brazil national youth teams.

From 2007 to December 2009, he worked as general manager of Fluminense youth teams.

Honours

Club
Internacional
Campeonato Gaúcho: 1981

Fluminense
Campeonato Brasileiro Série A: 1984
Campeonato Carioca: 1983, 1984, 1985

Porto
Primeira Liga: 1989–90
Supertaça Cândido de Oliveira: 1990

Grêmio
Campeonato Gaúcho: 1993

International
Brazil
Copa América: 1989
FIFA World Cup: 1994

References

External links
 

Brazilian footballers
Brazilian expatriate footballers
Brazil international footballers
Sport Club Internacional players
Brescia Calcio players
FC Porto players
Sport Club Corinthians Paulista players
CR Flamengo footballers
Fluminense FC players
Genoa C.F.C. players
Grêmio Foot-Ball Porto Alegrense players
Middlesbrough F.C. players
New York Red Bulls players
Campeonato Brasileiro Série A players
Premier League players
Serie A players
Serie B players
Primeira Liga players
Major League Soccer players
Expatriate footballers in England
Expatriate footballers in Portugal
Expatriate footballers in Italy
Expatriate soccer players in the United States
1986 FIFA World Cup players
1989 Copa América players
1990 FIFA World Cup players
1991 Copa América players
1994 FIFA World Cup players
Copa América-winning players
FIFA World Cup-winning players
Brazilian beach soccer players
People from Bagé
1964 births
Living people
Brazilian expatriate sportspeople in England
Brazilian expatriate sportspeople in Italy
Brazilian expatriate sportspeople in Portugal
Brazilian expatriate sportspeople in the United States
Brazilian football managers
Guarani FC managers
Figueirense FC managers
Association football fullbacks
Sportspeople from Rio Grande do Sul